Gonzalo Garcés (born 16 August 1974) is an Argentine editor and writer known for his writing on masculinity, and for his criticisms of feminism. He also contributes to newspapers and magazines such as La Nación, Clarín, El Mercurio, Reforma, Brecha, Gatopardo, Perfil, El País and Quimera.

In 2000 he won the Premio Biblioteca Breve for his novel Los impacientes.

Biography 
Gonzalo Garcés was born on 16 August 1974 in Buenos Aires. He studied Philosophy at the University of Buenos Aires and Philology at University of Sorbonne.

Works

Novels 
 1997 Diciembre. Buenos Aires: Sudamericana 
 2000 Los impacientes. Buenos Aires: Seix Barral .  Biblioteca Breve Award   
 2003 El futuro. Buenos Aires: Grupo Planeta Editorial/Seix Barral  
 2012 El miedo. Buenos Aires: Mondadori 
 2014 Hacete hombre. Buenos Aires: Marea 
 2016 Cómo ser malos. Ensayos sobre literatura. Buenos Aires: Letras del sur

References

External links 
 Interview to Gonzalo Garcés for Revista Paco
 Interview about his latest book Hacete hombre for  La Voz

1974 births
Argentine male writers
Living people
Male critics of feminism
Criticism of feminism
University of Buenos Aires alumni